Michelle Kasold (born May 26, 1987) is an American field hockey player. Kasold was on the team that won the field hockey tournament at the 2011 Pan American Games. She also made the U.S. team for the 2012 Summer Olympics.

Kasold was born in San Jose, California. She graduated from East Chapel Hill High School in 2005 and Wake Forest University in 2009.

References

External links
 
 Behind the Uniform (Michelle Kasold's blog)
 Michelle Kasold verified Twitter account

1987 births
Living people
American female field hockey players
Field hockey players at the 2011 Pan American Games
Field hockey players at the 2012 Summer Olympics
Field hockey players at the 2016 Summer Olympics
Olympic field hockey players of the United States
Wake Forest Demon Deacons field hockey players
Pan American Games gold medalists for the United States
Pan American Games medalists in field hockey
Medalists at the 2011 Pan American Games
21st-century American women